Michael Joseph Gross (born 1970) is an American author and journalist.

He is a contributing editor to Vanity Fair, where he covers topics including politics, technology, and national security.  He has also written extensively for publications such as The New York Times, The Boston Globe, and GQ. Gross is the author of the book Starstruck: When a Fan Gets Close to Fame, published in 2006 by Bloomsbury Publishing.

Gross attended Williams College, and later studied at Princeton Theological Seminary. After graduating, he wrote speeches for Massachusetts Governor William Weld, a Republican.

References

External links 
 Official webpage

American male journalists
Living people
1970 births
Williams College alumni
Princeton Theological Seminary alumni
Vanity Fair (magazine) people